Felda may refer to:

 Felda (Ohm), a river of Hesse, Germany
 Felda (Werra), a river of Thuringia, Germany
 Felda, Florida, an unincorporated community in Hendry County, Florida
 Felda United F.C., a Malaysian football club
 Federal Land Development Authority (FELDA), Malaysia